The K-50 telephone repair trucks were used by the U.S. Army Signal Corps, during and after World War II, for the installation and repair of hard telephone lines, primarily in territories liberated from Nazi Germany by the Allied forces.

History
The Signal Corps, at the beginning of World War II needed a light telephone repair truck, and contracted initially with GMC-Chevrolet, and later with Dodge / Fargo, for truck chassis to mount a standard American Telephone & Telegraph tool box bed. The original bed was styled after the Streamline Moderne motif of the 1930s. The second style bed, the K-50B, was a more utilitarian square box, that mounted the ladder on the top rather than on the side. It was often used in conjunction with the K-38 trailer. All were eventually replaced by the Dodge M37 series V-41 trucks.

The initial trucks were 1/2-ton, rear-wheel driven GMC-Chevrolet units, supplied under two contracts, in 1940 and 1941 respectively. All later K-50 and K-50B trucks were 1/2-ton and 3/4-ton units, contracted from Dodge / Fargo, from 1941 until war's end. Except for two initial rear-wheel drive evaluation units, all Dodges contracted were four-wheel drive.

Versions

 GMC-Chevrolet 1/2-ton, 4x2, (1940 & 1941)
 33 units in 1940 and 49 units in 1941 amounted to a total of 82 trucks.
 Dodge 1/2-ton, mostly 4x4, (1941), boxes by Highway trailer Co., Edgerton, Wisconsin
 WC-39, T112, 4x2 – 1 built
 WC-43, T215, 4x4 – 370 units built
 WC-50, T112, 4x2 – 1 built
 Dodge 3/4-ton 4x4
 WC-59, T214, 4x4 – 549 built, box by Highway Trailer Co.
 WC-61, T214, K-50B, 4x4 – 58 built; box by American Coach and Body Co., Cleveland, Ohio

See also
 Dodge WC series
 Autocar K-30 and K-31 Signal Corps trucks
 List of U.S. Signal Corps vehicles

Reference notes

General references
 TM 9-2800 Standard Military Motor Vehicles. dated 1 sept. 1943: https://www.scribd.com/doc/140198120/TM-9-2800-1943-STANDARD-MILITARY-MOTOR-VEHICLES-1-SEPTEMBER-1943
 TM 9-2800 Military vehicles dated oct. 1947: https://www.scribd.com/doc/188375301/TM-9-2800-1947
 TM 9-2800-1 Military vehicles dated February 1953: https://www.scribd.com/doc/183017787/TM-9-2800-1-1953-INCLUDING-C1-EN-C2-pdf
 TM 9-808: https://www.scribd.com/doc/153243048/TM9-808-DODGE-3-4-TON-4-X-4-TRUCK
 SNL G657 Master Parts Book Dec. 1943

External links
 http://www.olive-drab.com/idphoto/id_photos_wc59.php
 http://www.wc43.com/
 http://www.brads41-46chevys.com/id12.html
 http://www.olive-drab.com/idphoto/id_photos_chevy_early.php

 
Chevrolet trucks
Military trucks
Soft-skinned vehicles
Military vehicles of the United States
Military trucks of the United States
World War II military vehicles
World War II vehicles of the United States
Motor vehicles manufactured in the United States